Grant Township is a township in DeKalb County, in the U.S. state of Missouri.

Grant Township has the name of General Ulysses S. Grant, afterward President of the United States.

References

Townships in Missouri
Townships in DeKalb County, Missouri